Thomas Acton may refer to:
 Thomas Acton (Jesuit) (1662–1721), English Jesuit and missionary 
 Thomas C. Acton (1823–1898), American public servant, politician, and police commissioner of the New York City Police Department
 Thomas Acton (British Army officer) (1917–1977)